

Wanja Mary Sellers (born September 3, 1962) is an American-Italian actress and director, known for her performances in Italian horror films.

Early life
Wnanja Mary Sellers was born on September 3, 1962 in Nairobi, Kenya.

Career
She relocated to Rome, Italy and pursued an acting career. She made her screen debut in Fabrizio Laurenti's short film, The Immigrant (1985), becoming well-known in the second half of the 1980s for starring in numerous Italian horror films such as Stage Fright (1987), Ghosthouse (1988) and Demons 5 (1989).

Personal life
Sellers married Italian director Fabrizio Laurenti, with whom she had worked in the films The Immigrant (1985) and Contamination .7 (1993). Their children, Diego and Rosabell Laurenti Sellers, are also actors.

Filmography

The Immigrant (1985)
Stage Fright (1987)
Man on Fire (1987)
Eleven Days, Eleven Nights (1987)
Ghosthouse (1988)
The Last Temptation of Christ (1988)
Valentina (1989)
Arctic Warriors (1989)
La maschera del demonio (Demons 5) (1989)
Lambada (1990)
Testimone oculare (1990)
Ask for the Moon (1991)
Cherchez la femme (1993)
The Crawlers (1993)
La stanza accanto (1994)
Voci notturne (1995)
Olimpo Lupo - Cronista di nera (1995)
Romeo & Juliet (2013)

References

External links
 
 

1962 births
Living people
20th-century American actresses
21st-century American actresses
American people of Italian descent
American television actresses
Italian film actresses